The Boeing Y1B-20 (Boeing 316) was designed as an improvement on the Boeing XB-15 (Y1- indicates a funding source outside normal fiscal year procurement.)  It was slightly larger than its predecessor, and was intended to use much more powerful engines.  It was presented to the Army in early 1938, and two orders were placed soon after.  The order was reversed before construction began.

Despite their cancellation, the XB-15 and Y1B-20 laid the groundwork for the Boeing B-29 Superfortress.

Specifications (as designed)

See also

References

External links

Encyclopedia of American Aircraft
USAF Museum description of Y1B-20

B-20, Boeing
Four-engined tractor aircraft
Cancelled military aircraft projects of the United States
Mid-wing aircraft
Four-engined piston aircraft